Early Games (aka Early Games for Young Children) is a 1982 educational computer game by Counterpoint Software and Springboard Software, designed by John Paulson. The game contain a series of educational mini-games targeted at preschoolers and designed to teach basic math, language, and logic skills. It was part of the Skill Builder series, along with Fraction Factory, Match Maker, and Piece of Cake.

Reception
By April 6, 1985, Early Games had maintained an 18-week streak on the Billboard charts for Top Educational Software. After dropping off the charts the following week, it re-entered at #5 on April 20, 1985. By August of that year, the game would spend a total of 36 weeks on the charts, then sitting at #3. On May 3, 1986, the game re-entered the charts again, at #8.

PC Magazine negatively compared Early Games for Young Childrens graphics to those of competing title My Letters, Numbers, and Words, through it praised the user friendliness of the former's menu, ultimately giving the program a score of 10.5/18. My Letters, Numbers, and Words received a score of 14.5/18 by comparison. Texas Monthly thought the game was "easy to operate", and added that both the game and Kids on Keys (from Spinnaker Software) were great options to serve as first experiences for young players to have with computers.

References

External links

1982 video games
Educational video games
Apple II games
Atari 8-bit family games
Commodore 64 games
DOS games
Classic Mac OS games
TRS-80 games
TRS-80 Color Computer games
Video games developed in the United States